Wolf Warrior is a 2015 Chinese war film written and directed by Wu Jing. It stars Wu Jing along with Scott Adkins, Yu Nan and Kevin Lee. It was released on 2 April 2015. A sequel, titled Wolf Warrior 2, was released in China in 2017 and became the all-time highest-grossing film in China.

Plot
In 2008, a combined task group of People's Liberation Army Special Operations Forces and Chinese police raid a drug smuggling operation in an abandoned chemical facility in southern China. The leader of the smuggling operation, Wu Ji, holds one of his own men hostage while taking cover behind a section of the facility's reinforced wall.
Leng Feng, a skilled PLA sniper, ignores orders to stand down and fires three shots at a weak section of the wall, penetrating through on the third shot and killing Wu Ji. Leng Feng is sent to solitary confinement as punishment, but is approached by Long Xiaoyun, the female commander of the legendary 'Wolf Warriors', an elite unit within the PLA tasked with simulating foreign tactics for the PLA to train against. Long Xiaoyun offers Leng Feng a place in the Wolf Warriors. Meanwhile, in the Philippines, crime lord Min Deng, the older brother of Wu Ji, hires ex-US Navy SEAL “Tom Cat” (Scott Adkins) and his group to assassinate Leng Feng and avenge his brother.

The Wolf Warriors participate in a training exercise in a remote and uninhabited forested region on China's southern border. During the exercise, Tom Cat and his mercenaries ambush a Wolf Warrior squad, killing one of Leng Feng's comrades. Subsequently, the PLA and the Wolf Warriors are tasked with hunting down Tom Cat‘s squad to restore their honor. The combined infantry force move into the forest but are delayed by multiple traps set by Tom Cat and pinned down by sniper fire until Leng Feng manages to kill the shooter. Afterwards, the rest of the PLA force engages Tom Cat's other mercenaries, who stage a fighting retreat but are eventually overwhelmed and killed one by one. Meanwhile, Long Xiaoyun and the other PLA commanders deduce that Ming Deng himself is also in the training area to take possession of a smuggled cache of biotechnology, which could allow the creation of a genetic weapon that could target Chinese people exclusively.

Leng Feng eventually catches Tom Cat just before China's southern border. Leng Feng is nearly defeated, but manages to kill Tom Cat with his own knife. Medical personnel from a PLA relief force arrive, but Leng Feng recognises the wrist tattoo of the medic that approaches him and realizes that they are Min Deng's men in PLA uniforms. He attacks them, eventually holding Min Deng himself at bayonet point on the very edge of the Chinese border. Min Deng's paramilitary force approaches from the other side of the border, but so do the rest of the Wolf Warriors and PLA soldiers. Min Deng's force retreats, leaving him to be arrested.

Cast
 Wu Jing as Leng Feng, a marksman in the People's Liberation Army who was initially court martialled and reprimanded for failing to obey a direct order during an operation. He is later recruited into a Chinese Special Forces Unit called "War Wolf" after Long Xiaoyun takes an interest in him.
 Yu Nan as Lieutenant Colonel Long Xiaoyun, Commander of the Chinese Special Forces Unit "War Wolf"
 Ni Dahong as Ming Deng, a drug lord who hires a group of foreign mercenaries to avenge his brother's death at the hands of Leng Feng.
 Scott Adkins as "Tom Cat," a former US Navy SEAL turned mercenary, who is hired by Meng Deng to kill Leng Feng
 Kevin Lee as "Mad Cow"
 Shi Zhaoqi
 Zhou Xiaoou
 Fang Zibin
 Guo Guangping
 Ru Ping
 Hong Wei
 Wang Sen
 Zhuang Xiaolong
 Chris Collins

Production
The script went through 14 drafts over seven years. In order to portray more realistic combat scenes, the movie used five missiles (each at a value of one million yuan), more than 30,000 rounds of ammunition, and a variety of Chinese active military aircraft, including the Chengdu J-10, Harbin Z-9, and CAIC Z-10. In one large battle scene, 32 active tanks appeared in the same shot, including a Type 96 tank.

In order to prepare for the film, with the support of Chinese PLA Nanjing Military Region, Wu Jing trained for 18 months at a camp in Nanjing Military Region. 
On the first day of shooting, it was the hottest summer in Nanjing's history. The temperature was up to 49.8 °C, making 5 extra actors suffer from shock.

Most of the film was made on location in Jiangsu province, at sites including Nanjing and Sun Yat-sen Mausoleum.

Box office
As of 25 May 2015, it has earned US$89.11 million in China.

In China, it opened on 2 April 2015, earning US$33.32 million in its 4-day opening weekend topping the Chinese box office. In its second weekend, it fell to number two, earning US$36.19 million (behind Furious 7).

Critical response
The film had an overall rating of 6.8 on the Chinese review site Douban as of August 2017. Variety magazine wrote: "To a layperson's eyes, the military exercise does look authentic, and the cross-country skirmishes are ruggedly watchable on an acrobatic level. Yet it's impossible to overlook the inanity of the plotting".

Awards

International influence 
Wolf Warrior and its sequel, Wolf Warrior 2, are the namesake of China's aggressive 'wolf warrior diplomacy' under Xi Jinping's administration.

References

External links
 
 Wolf Warrior at Douban (in Chinese)

2015 3D films
2015 action thriller films
2010s war films
Chinese propaganda films
Chinese 3D films
Chinese action thriller films
Chinese war films
Films about military personnel
Films about the People's Liberation Army
2010s Mandarin-language films
2010s English-language films
Films shot in Nanjing
Films directed by Wu Jing (actor)
Works about Chinese military personnel